Idiotlamp Productions is an independent production company based in London, UK, founded by the creative partnership of Jim Field Smith and George Kay.

Credits

Idiotlamp is the creative entity behind the multi-national Netflix series Criminal, comprising the four mini-series Criminal: UK, Criminal: Spain, Criminal: France and Criminal: Germany. Prior to that the company produced Stag for the BBC. The company was also behind the short films "Where Have I Been All Your Life" (2007, 20 mins), written by George Kay and directed by Jim Field Smith, and starring Imelda Staunton and James Corden, "Goodbye to the Normals" (2006), "Missing Moscow" and the mini documentary series "My Friend..." for Channel 4.

References

External links
 Idiotlamp Productions website

Film production companies of the United Kingdom